Jamie Arnold may refer to:

 Jamie Arnold (baseball) (born 1974), Major League Baseball pitcher
 Jamie Arnold (basketball) (born 1975), American-born Israeli basketball player

See also
James Arnold (disambiguation)